A surfaced block is a concrete masonry unit with a durable, slick surface designed to provide resistance to frequent scrubbing and cleaning, graffiti, chemical exposure, moisture, impact, and abrasion.

Common Types
Common types of surfaced blocks include glazed blocks, tile-faced blocks, sealed ground-face blocks, and polyurethane coated CMU.

Typical Usage
Surfaced blocks are found primarily in areas where a sanitary environment is required. Food and Beverage manufacturing plants, hospitals, pharmaceutical manufacturing plants, restaurants, public facilities, and schools use this type of construction material.

Building materials
Masonry

See also 
Glazed architectural terra-cotta